Bon Homme County is a county in the U.S. state of South Dakota. As of the 2020 census, the population was 7,003. Its county seat is Tyndall.

History
Bon Homme County was created in 1862. "Bon Homme" was first used by Lewis and Clark in 1804 as the name for a 2,000 acre island in the Missouri River. When settlers arrived in the late 1850s they borrowed the name, and when the county was created it was named for the village of Bon Homme. A proposal to change the county name to "Jefferson" in 1865 was rejected. The French word "bonhomme" means "good man." The original island is now submerged under Lewis and Clark Lake. The village of Bon Homme was the original county seat until 1885, when it moved to Tyndall.

Bon Homme County is the point of origin for the Siberian alien, Kali tragus, a type of tumbleweed, first reported here in 1877, probably introduced in a shipment of flax seed from Ukraine.

Geography

Bon Homme County lies on the south line of South Dakota. Its south boundary line abuts the north boundary line of the state of Nebraska (across the Missouri River). The west boundary line of the county is roughly defined by Choteau Creek, which flows southward to discharge in the river. The county terrain consists of low rolling hills, sloping to the river valley; most of the area is devoted to agriculture. The terrain's highest point is the county's NW corner, at 1,883' (574m) ASL.

Major highways

  South Dakota Highway 25
  South Dakota Highway 37
  South Dakota Highway 46
  South Dakota Highway 50
  South Dakota Highway 52

Adjacent counties

 Hutchinson County - north
 Yankton County - east
 Knox County, Nebraska - south
 Charles Mix County - west

Protected area

 Bucholz Waterfowl Production Area
 Charley Creek Unit
 Cosby Waterfowl Production Area
 Missouri National Recreational River (part)
 Sand Creek Recreation Area
 Schaefer Waterfowl Production Area
 Scheffel Waterfowl Production Area
 Snatch Creek Recreation Area
 South Bon Homme State Shooting Area
 Springfield State Recreation Area
 Tabor State Lakeside Use Area

Lakes

 Lake Henry
 Hruska Lake
 Kloucek Lake
 Lewis and Clark Lake (part)
 Meiers Lake

Demographics

2000 census
As of the 2000 United States Census, there were 7,260 people, 2,635 households, and 1,786 families in the county. The population density was 13 people per square mile (5/km2). There were 3,007 housing units at an average density of 5 per square mile (2/km2). The racial makeup of the county was 95.51% White, 0.62% Black or African American, 2.99% Native American, 0.08% Asian, 0.18% from other races, and 0.62% from two or more races. 0.58% of the population were Hispanic or Latino of any race. 41.3% were of German, 19.8% Czech and 9.9% Dutch ancestry.

There were 2,635 households, out of which 28.70% had children under the age of 18 living with them, 59.80% were married couples living together, 5.10% had a female householder with no husband present, and 32.20% were non-families. 29.50% of all households were made up of individuals, and 16.50% had someone living alone who was 65 years of age or older. The average household size was 2.38 and the average family size was 2.95.

The county population contained 23.10% under the age of 18, 7.60% from 18 to 24, 26.80% from 25 to 44, 21.70% from 45 to 64, and 20.80% who were 65 years of age or older. The median age was 40 years. For every 100 females there were 123.00 males. For every 100 females age 18 and over, there were 126.40 males.

The median income for a household in the county was $30,644, and the median income for a family was $36,924. Males had a median income of $24,303 versus $20,307 for females. The per capita income for the county was $13,892. About 9.40% of families and 12.90% of the population were below the poverty line, including 16.20% of those under age 18 and 13.80% of those age 65 or over.

2010 census
As of the 2010 United States Census, there were 7,070 people, 2,457 households, and 1,572 families in the county. The racial makeup of the county was 89.8% white, 7.1% American Indian, 1.0% black or African American, 0.1% Asian, 0.6% from other races, and 1.4% from two or more races. Those of Hispanic or Latino origin made up 1.8% of the population. In terms of ancestry, 48.6% were German, 20.6% were Czech, 11.7% were Dutch, 7.8% were Irish, 6.1% were Norwegian, and 1.7% were American.

Of the 2,457 households, 25.6% had children under the age of 18 living with them, 55.7% were married couples living together, 5.5% had a female householder with no husband present, 36.0% were non-families, and 32.8% of all households were made up of individuals. The average household size was 2.24 and the average family size was 2.84. The median age was 43.1 years.

The median income for a household in the county was $41,107 and the median income for a family was $51,910. Males had a median income of $34,478 versus $28,464 for females. The per capita income for the county was $20,074. About 10.1% of families and 12.4% of the population were below the poverty line, including 16.7% of those under age 18 and 12.6% of those age 65 or over.

Communities

Cities

 Avon
 Scotland
 Springfield
 Tyndall (county seat)

Town
 Tabor

Census-designated place
 Bon Homme Colony
 Running Water

Unincorporated communities
 Kingsburg
Perkins

Politics
Bon Homme County voters often vote Republican. In only two national elections since 1976 has the county selected the Democratic Party candidate.

See also

 National Register of Historic Places listings in Bon Homme County, South Dakota
 Lewis and Clark Lake

References

 
South Dakota counties on the Missouri River
1862 establishments in Dakota Territory
Populated places established in 1862